The 2015 Duck Commander 500 was a NASCAR Sprint Cup Series race held on April 11, 2015 at Texas Motor Speedway in Fort Worth, Texas. Contested over 334 laps on the  quad-oval track, it was the seventh race of the 2015 NASCAR Sprint Cup Series. Jimmie Johnson won the race, his second win of the season and first in the Texas spring race, while Kevin Harvick finished second and Dale Earnhardt Jr. finished third. Joey Logano and Brad Keselowski rounded out the top five.

Kurt Busch won the pole and led 45 laps on his way to a 14th-place finish. Johnson led a race high of 128 laps, with 29 lead changes among nine different drivers, as well as eight caution flag periods for 40 laps.

This was the 72nd career victory for Johnson, his fifth at the track and the seventh for Hendrick Motorsports. This win moved Johnson up to sixth in the points standings, while Harvick left Texas with a 26-point lead over Logano. Chevrolet increased their lead in the manufacturers' championship to 19 points over Ford.

The Duck Commander 500 was by Fox Sports on the broadcast Fox network for the American television audience. The radio broadcast for the race was carried by the Performance Racing Network and Sirius XM NASCAR Radio.

Report

Background

Texas Motor Speedway is a speedway located in the northernmost portion of the U.S. city of Fort Worth, Texas – the portion located in Denton County, Texas. The track measures  around and is banked 24 degrees in the turns, and is of the oval design, where the front straightaway juts outward slightly. The track layout is similar to Atlanta Motor Speedway and Charlotte Motor Speedway, tracks also owned by Speedway Motorsports.

Kevin Harvick entered Texas with a 24-point lead over Joey Logano, while Martin Truex Jr. entered 32 points back in third. Brad Keselowski entered 57 points back in fourth, and Kasey Kahne entered 70 points back in fifth.

Entry list
The entry list for the Duck Commander 500 was released on Friday, April 2, 2015 at 11:38 a.m. Eastern time. Forty-six cars were entered for the race. Ryan Blaney in the No. 21 Wood Brothers Racing Ford and Michael McDowell were the two new entries that were not entered for the previous race at Martinsville. Brian Scott returned to the seat of the No. 33 Hillman-Circle Sport LLC Chevrolet. Travis Kvapil was entered to drive the No. 39 Chevrolet for Hillman-Circle Sport LLC, but the team withdrew from the race on Thursday, April 9.

Practice

First practice

Final practice

Qualifying

After winning the pole, Busch thanked his entire team for the good result, stating that "everyone chipped in". Busch also stated that his second pole of the 2015 season felt good, and that he was looking "to dial it in and get that long-run speed out of the car". Championship leader and team-mate Kevin Harvick joined Busch on the front row, having been out-qualified by 0.018 seconds. Harvick felt that his team "stuck to our plan" and that "everything worked out good". In third place was Team Penske's Brad Keselowski, who stated that he was "being first in class", behind the cars of Busch and Harvick in the grid order. He also stated that "it never helps to have extra runs on the tires, but we made the most of it".

Keselowski's Penske team-mate Joey Logano qualified sixth, believing that his car was more suited to the race and that he "kind of finished as expected for qualifying". Logano also mentioned that his crew chief Todd Gordon had told him that he won from 10th last year, so that he was "improving". Dale Earnhardt Jr. failed to make it out of the first part of the qualifying session, and like Logano, he felt that his car would perform better in the race than in qualifying. In order to improve the car, Earnhardt stated that he and his team "will have to go home and work on it". With 45 entrants, Jeb Burton and Brendan Gaughan both failed to qualify.

Qualifying results

Race

First-half

Start
The race was scheduled to start at 7:46 p.m., but started a couple of minutes later when Kurt Busch led the field to the green flag. He would not maintain the lead, however, as his teammate Kevin Harvick passed him exiting turn 4 on the opening lap. Engine issues were prevalent in the opening stages of the race, as J. J. Yeley took his car to the garage on lap 13 because of engine issues, and Ryan Blaney also reported that his engine was sputtering. The first caution of the race flew on lap 32 when Alex Kennedy spun out in turn 4 after he got loose in turn 3. Kurt Busch exited pit road ahead of Harvick to take the lead, while Justin Allgaier was forced to restart from the tail end for a commitment line violation. Dale Earnhardt Jr. made a second stop under the caution to add lug nuts to the left-rear of his car – instead of the normal five, the tire had only two.

The race restarted on lap 37 with Busch out front. Harvick took the lead by the end of the lap, before Busch was able to get back to the front. Brad Keselowski, running fourth at the time, made an unscheduled stop on lap 67 and dropped to 30th. Blaney retired from the race on lap 71, as his engine issues continued. Kyle Larson kicked off a wave of green flag pit stops on lap 79. Busch surrendered the lead on lap 81 to make his stop and Jeff Gordon assumed the lead. Gordon pitted the next lap and the lead cycled to Keselowski, following his unscheduled pit stop. Ricky Stenhouse Jr. was forced to serve a drive-through penalty for speeding on pit road. Jimmie Johnson took the lead on lap 109, just as debris in turn 3 brought out the second caution of the race. Johnson and Harvick swapped the lead on pit road with Johnson maintaining the lead on exit. Denny Hamlin was forced to drop to the tail end of the field for driving through too many pit boxes exiting pit road.

Green flag run
The race restarted on lap 114 with Johnson in the lead. Kevin Harvick took back the lead on lap 125, and led the next portion of the race before Johnson took back the lead on lap 156, just as cars began hitting pit road for green flag pit stops. Johnson and Harvick swapped the lead over the next few laps, before Harvick ceded his position for a stop and Kasey Kahne assumed the position. Kahne spent two laps at the front of the race, before Johnson cycled back to the head of the field on lap 160. Landon Cassill made an unscheduled stop on lap 167 for a flat tire, almost hitting the wall in turn 4.

Second-half

Halfway
Debris in turn 3 brought out the third caution of the race on lap 169. Johnson and Harvick swapped the lead on pit road being pitted on opposite ends, but it was Johnson that exited with the lead. The race restarted on lap 177. Kahne, running eighth, made an unscheduled stop for a loose wheel on lap 198, and rejoined the race in 22nd position. Johnson gave up the lead on lap 220 to make his stop, handing the lead to Paul Menard. He led a lap before the lead went to Kahne, after his unscheduled pit stop. Johnson passed him on fresher tires on lap 226, and held the lead to the fourth caution of the race, which flew on lap 227 when Matt Kenseth just about spun out in turn 4. Johnson and Harvick again swapped the lead on pit road with Johnson again leaving with the lead for the restart, with 100 laps to go.

Bad night for HScott Motorsports
The fifth caution of the race flew with 86 laps to go when Michael Annett hit the wall in turn 2. Just as in the previous pit stop cycle, Johnson and Harvick swapped the lead on pit road with Johnson exiting with the lead. Trevor Bayne was forced to restart at the tail end for driving through too many pit boxes exiting pit road. The race restarted with 79 laps to go, but was soon back under yellow flag conditions – for the sixth time, with 75 laps to go – after Allgaier hit the wall in turn 2. After an extensive clean up of oil on pit road, a number of drivers stayed out – led by Joey Logano – while Johnson pitted. Keselowski was forced to drop to the tail end of the field for a commitment violation, while Stenhouse was forced to drop to the tail end of the field for his crew being over the wall too soon.

Final 100 miles
The race restarted with 65 laps to go with Logano in the lead. Kevin Harvick retook the lead with 49 laps to go, before debris in turn 3 brought out the seventh caution of the race as Kenseth hit the wall with 41 laps to go. The race restarted with 35 laps to go, before more debris brought out the eighth caution of the race as A. J. Allmendinger hit the wall with 25 laps to go. Jamie McMurray exited pit road with the lead by taking just two tires, while Kyle Larson and Casey Mears were forced to drop to the tail end of the field for driving through too many pit boxes.

Finish

The race restarted with 21 laps to go. Joey Logano was bumped out of the way by Kevin Harvick in turn 1 and managed to avoid hitting the wall, but fell back to eighth in the running order. Harvick stated post-race that the incident was "the chance you take when you block" and that a driver would "just have to kind of knock them out of the way". Logano felt that the move was "understandable" and that he expected "to get raced the way I race people, and I would do the same thing". Johnson took the lead from McMurray with 14 laps to go, and was able to hold off Harvick – who had been closing in after the Logano incident – to score the victory.

Post-race

Driver comments
In Victory Lane, Johnson reflected upon his 72nd win in the series, describing his Chevrolet as "a great, great racecar", and that it was the perfect result after the Easter break, stating that it "was good for us, gave us a chance to reboot, relax and get back in the swing of things". After his second-place finish, Harvick stated that he was "not disappointed at all", adding that "racing for wins is what we're here to do". Gordon, who gambled on the final pit stop by changing just two tires, restarted second and scored a seventh-place finish – his best of the season. Gordon felt that he "struggled" during the race, but also praised his crew chief Alan Gustafson for a "great gamble". Truex, who had only five top ten finishes in 2014, scored his seventh top ten finish of 2015 with a ninth-place finish. Truex described the evening as "a hard-fought night, for sure" but also stated the result was "still a top 10, so all in all, it was a good night for us".

Race results

Race statistics
29 lead changes among 9 different drivers
8 cautions for 40 laps
Time of race: 3 hours, 33 minutes, 57 seconds
Average speed: 
Jimmie Johnson took home $523,501 in winnings

Race awards
 Coors Light Pole Award: Kurt Busch (27.857)
 3M Lap Leader: Jimmie Johnson (128 laps)
 American Ethanol Green Flag Restart Award: Kevin Harvick (29.877)
 Duralast Brakes "Bake In The Race" Award: Kevin Harvick
 Freescale "Wide Open": Kevin Harvick
 Ingersoll Rand Power Move: Ryan Newman, 10 positions
 MAHLE Clevite Engine Builder of the Race: Hendrick Engines, #48
 Mobil 1 Driver of the Race: Jimmie Johnson (137.5 driver rating)
 Moog Steering and Suspension Problem Solver of The Race: Dale Earnhardt Jr. (crew chief Greg Ives (0.431 seconds))
 NASCAR Sprint Cup Leader Bonus: No winner: rolls over to $40,000 at next event
 Sherwin-Williams Fastest Lap: Jamie McMurray (Lap 315, 28.889)
 Sunoco Rookie of The Race: Brett Moffitt

Media

Television
Fox Sports covered their 15th race at Texas Motor Speedway. Mike Joy, Larry McReynolds and Darrell Waltrip had the call in the booth for the race. Jamie Little, Chris Neville, and Matt Yocum handled the pit road duties for the television side.

Radio
PRN had the radio call for the race, which was simulcast on Sirius XM NASCAR Radio. Doug Rice, Mark Garrow and Wendy Venturini called the race in the booth when the field was racing down the front stretch. Rob Albright called the race from atop the condo outside turn 2 when the field was racing through turns 1 and 2. Pat Patterson called the race from a billboard outside turn 3 when the field was racing through turns 3 and 4. Brad Gillie, Brett McMillan, Jim Noble and Steve Richards worked pit road for PRN.

Standings after the race

Drivers' Championship standings

Manufacturers' Championship standings

Note: Only the first sixteen positions are included for the driver standings.

Notes

References

Duck Commander 500
Duck Commander 500
NASCAR races at Texas Motor Speedway